Belphegor, or the Phantom of the Louvre is a 1965 French television miniseries directed by Claude Barma, based on the 1927 novel by Arthur Bernède. It consists of four 70 minutes episodes.

Plot 
A mysterious phantom appears in the Musée du Louvre in Paris at night. The guards are unable to catch it. A student, André Bellegarde obstinately tries to find out more about the strange creature by himself. He seems to be more effective in doing so than the local police led by commissaire Menardier. Bellegarde does cooperate with the police, too, but he mostly goes his own way investigating Belphégor's activity. A secret society is in the background. Bellegarde, in the meantime, is involved in two romances and cannot decide which woman to dedicate himself as the case gets more and more serious and criminal and threads meet.

Cast
 Juliette Gréco as Laurence / Stéphanie Hiquet
 Isaac Alvarez as Belphégor
 Yves Rénier as André Bellegarde
 Christine Delaroche as Colette Ménardier
 René Dary as Commissaire Ménardier
 François Chaumette as Boris Williams
 Sylvie as Lady Hodwin
 Paul Crauchet as Le gardien Gautrais
 Marguerite Muni as Louise Gautrais
 René Alone as Doublet
 Yves Bureau as Ménard
 Jacky Calatayud as L'enfant

Legacy
Danish filmmaker Lars von Trier has credited Belphegor and David Lynch's television series Twin Peaks as inspirations for his miniseries The Kingdom.

References

External links
 

1960s French television miniseries
1965 French television series debuts
1965 French television series endings
French crime television series
Office de Radiodiffusion Télévision Française original programming
Films directed by Claude Barma